Benjamin F. Hake (September 3, 1895, Omaha, Nebraska - August 5, 1973, Santa Barbara, California) was an American petroleum geologist who helped explore the Mexican oil fields in Baja California, the west coast of Mexico, Tamaulipas and Veracruz. He served in both World Wars; in World War I with the ambulance corps and Railway Artillery Reserve in France. In World War II he was an officer, working on the Canol project and advising on national petroleum policies. After the war, he helped Gulf Oil Corp in a number of countries including Morocco, Brazil, Tunisia and Algeria, and became General Manager of Gulf Oil Company of Bolivia.

Early life and family
Hake was born on September 3, 1895, in Omaha, Nebraska, the son of Benjamin Franklin Hake Sr. and Aura Smith Hake. As a child, he traveled around America with his family, but spent much of his time in Wyoming. He graduated from Polytechnic High School in Los Angeles, and after graduation he operated a guide and taxi service in Worland, Wyoming for two years. In 1916, he got a job as assistant and guide to Charles Dake on the Wyoming Geological Survey. This steered him towards geology. But, his life as a student was interrupted by World War I. He entered as an enlisted man in the U.S. Medical Corps, and transferred to the Railway Artillery Reserve, and was honorably discharged at the end of the war with the rank of Lieutenant. Back at Stanford, he studied under Bailey Willis and got an A.B. in geology.

For his first assignment, he was hired by Marland Oil Company of Ponca City, Oklahoma, to survey large areas of the west coast of Mexico including Mazatlan, Puerto Vallarta and Acapulco as well as Baja California to ascertain whether there were areas that should be explored in detail. The Mexican Revolution was still going on during this time and during his odyssey; Hake met some of the top Generals, slept in the huts of peons affected by the war, and crossed the deserts of Baja on mule back. While he was on this year-long assignment, he corresponded with his girlfriend, Kirby Ingoldsby, the first female mechanical engineering student at Stanford University. They were married several months after his return and remained married until her death in 1966. They had four children and five grandchildren.

Career
Hake worked for Marland and investigated areas in California, Tamaulipas, Vera Cruz, Hudson's Bay, Alberta, Saskatchewan and Manitoba. His study of the coastal ranges of California became the basis of his Masters' thesis. In 1929, he became Managing Director and Chief Geologist for Nordon Corp in Alberta. In this role, his advice was incorporated into the Oil and Gas Conservation Act of Alberta. He then moved to the Gulf Oil Company, directing engineering in Michigan, Indiana and several other states. In World War II, he re-entered the Army as a Major and was an advisor on the Canol project, America's first Alaskan pipeline. Then he worked with the Fuels and Lubricants division of the Office of Quartermaster General. He helped with planning and policy formation for the Petroleum Program; was promoted to Lieutenant Colonel and was awarded a Legion of Merit commendation in 1946. After the war, he returned to Gulf Oil Company and spent several years working in the Mediterranean and South America. In the early 1950s, he became General Manager of Gulf Oil Company of Bolivia. He retired to Santa Barbara, California, in 1959.

Hake was a popular lecturer and active author. He was a member of the Cosmos Club and a fellow of the American Geographical Society.

His papers include 'Scarps of southwestern Sierra Nevada, California': Bulletin of the Geological Society of America, December 1928; and 'Scientific Manpower and National Safety' in the Bulletin of the American Association of Petroleum Geologists 1956.

References
 Memorial to Benjamin Franklin Hake 1895-1973, Carl C. Addison, Geological Society of America 1974
 Memorials, Ben B. Cox, The American Association of Petroleum Geologists Bulletin V. 58, No. 12 (December 1974) P. 2535-2537

Further reading
 "Glaciers" on Alcan Highway: Whitehorse, Y.T., to Fairbanks, Alaska", Benjamin F. Hake, on Google books
 "A study of faulting in the Coast Ranges, California", Benjamin F. Hake on Google books

1895 births
1973 deaths
20th-century American geologists
Stanford University alumni
Recipients of the Legion of Merit